Pellenes longimanus is a species of jumping spider in the family Salticidae. It is found in the United States.

References

Further reading

 

Salticidae
Articles created by Qbugbot
Spiders described in 1913
Spiders of the United States